The Houston Carnegie Library, at Madison and Huddleston Sts. in Houston, Mississippi, is a Carnegie library that was built in 1909.  It was the first Carnegie library built in Mississippi and was just the second public library in the state.  It was listed on the National Register of Historic Places in 1978.

References

Libraries on the National Register of Historic Places in Mississippi
Queen Anne architecture in Mississippi
Prairie School architecture in Mississippi
Carnegie libraries in Mississippi
Library buildings completed in 1909
National Register of Historic Places in Chickasaw County, Mississippi